Flight Distance was an underground hip hop group from Ottawa, Ontario, Canada. The group consisted of MC Patience, DJ Calkuta, and MC/producer Bender, who was a former King of the Dot champion. Flight Distance released three albums over the course of their career: Run for Your Lives! in 2005, Bad Information in 2011, and High Priests of Low-Life in 2014. As of December 2014, they had begun work on their fourth album, entitled Harmony Chlorine, and were still working on it at the time of Bender's unexpected death on March 1, 2018.

Discography
Albums
 Run for Your Lives! (2005)
 Bad Information (2011)
 High Priests of Low-Life (2014)

EPs
 The Warning Shot (2005)

Singles
 "Real Teeth" (2010)
 "Worth" (2013)

References

External links
All of Benders Battles on VerseTracker.com
Official Site
Flight Distance on Facebook
Flight Distance on Bandcamp

Canadian hip hop groups
Musical groups from Ottawa
Musical groups established in 2004
Musical groups disestablished in 2018
Canadian musical trios
2004 establishments in Ontario
2018 disestablishments in Ontario